Odessa Mama or Odesa Mama or Odessa Mame or Odesa Mame or variation. may refer to:

"Odessa Mama" or "Odesa Mama" – a term used by the people of Odesa to lovingly refer to their city as "mother"
"Odessa Mama" (song) or "Odesa Mama" or "Odessa Mame" or "Odesa Mame" – a popular traditional Ukrainian Yiddish song
 Odessa-mama (song), a Russian language song by Evgeny Agranovich
Odessa-Mama, novel by Efraim Sevela, 2003 
Odessa-Mama (одесса-мама), Ukrainian TV series starring Pyotr Fyodorov, set in 1969, 2012-2013
 Odesa Mama, a 2010 art exhibition by Oleg Drozdov

See also

 Odesa (disambiguation)
 Odessa (disambiguation)

 Mama (disambiguation)
 Mame (disambiguation)